Alexander the Great's accomplishments and legacy have been preserved and depicted in many ways. Alexander has figured in works of both "high" and popular culture from his own era to the modern day. Some of these are highly fictionalized accounts, such as the Alexander Romance.

Ancient and Medieval literature

In the Bible
Daniel 8:5–8 and 21–22 states that a King of Greece will conquer the Medes and Persians but then die at the height of his power and have his kingdom broken into four kingdoms. This is sometimes taken as a reference to Alexander.

Alexander was briefly mentioned in the first Book of the Maccabees, however the name "Alexander" or "Alexander the Great" referring to the Macedonian King, never appears in the Bible. All of Chapter 1, verses 1–7 was about Alexander and this serves as an introduction of the book. This explains how the Greek influence reached the Land of Israel at that time.

In Middle Persian literature
Alexander is mentioned in the Zoroastrian Middle Persian work Arda Wiraz Nāmag as gizistag aleksandar ī hrōmāyīg, literally "Alexander the accursed, the Roman", due to his conquest of the Achaemenid Persian Empire and the burning of its ceremonial capital Persepolis, which was holding the sacred texts of Zoroastrianism in its Royal Archives. The book Arda Wiraz Nāmag was written in the late period of Sassanid Persian Empire, when the rivalry with the Romans was intense.

In the Qur'an

Alexander in the Qur'an often is identified in Islamic traditions as Dhul-Qarnayn, Arabic for the "Two-Horned One", possibly a reference to the appearance of a horn-headed figure that appears minted during his rule and later imitated in ancient Middle Eastern coinage. Accounts of Dhul-Qarnayn in the Qur'an, and so may refer to Alexander. Noteworthy is the fact that his favorite horse was named Bucephalus, which means "ram's head", alluding to the shape of a horned ram at its forehead.

In Persian literature

The Shahnameh of Ferdowsi, one of the oldest books written in New Persian, has a chapter about Alexander. It is a book of epic poetry written around 1000 AD, and is believed to have played an important role in the survival of the Persian language in the face of Arabic influence. It starts with a mythical history of Iran and then gives a story of Alexander, followed by a brief mention of the Arsacids. The accounts after that, still in epic poetry, portray historical figures. Alexander is described as a child of a Persian king, Daraaye Darab (the last in the list of kings in the book whose names do not match historical kings), and a daughter of Philip, a king. However, due to problems in the relationship between the Persian king and Philip's daughter, she is sent back to Rome. Alexander is born to her afterwards, but Philip claims him as his own son and keeps the true identity of the child secret.

His name is recorded as both Iskandar and Sikandar in Classical Persian literature.

He is known as Eskandar-e Maqdūnī ( "Alexander the Macedonian") in modern Iranian Persian.

Other references
He is known as al-Iskandar al-Makduni al-Yunani ("Alexander the Macedonian Greek") in Arabic, אלכסנדר מוקדון, Alexander Mokdon in Hebrew, and Tre-Qarnayia in Aramaic (the two-horned one, apparently due to an image on coins minted during his rule that seemingly depicted him with the two ram's horns of the Egyptian god Ammon), الاسكندر الاكبر, al-Iskandar al-Akbar ("Alexander the Great") in Arabic, سکندر اعظم, Skandar in Pashto.

Alexander is one of the two principals in most versions of the Diogenes and Alexander anecdote.

Cities

Around twenty towns or outposts were founded by Alexander the Great. Some of the main cities are:
 Alexandria, Egypt
 Alexandria Ariana, Afghanistan
 Alexandria in the Caucasus, Afghanistan
 Alexandria on the Oxus, Afghanistan
 Alexandria Arachosians, Afghanistan
 Alexandria on the Indus, Pakistan
 Alexandria Bucephalous, Pakistan
 Alexandria Eschate, "The furthest", Tajikistan
 Charax Spasinu (Alexandria), Iran
 İskenderun (Alexandretta), Turkey
 Kandahar (Alexandropolis), Afghanistan
 Iskandariya (Alexandria), Iraq

The Italian city of Alessandria is not named for Alexander the Great but for Pope Alexander III. However, the Medieval choice of this name was likely influenced by the example of the above cities.

As city planner

Literature

 Dante talks well about him in the Convivio and De Monarchia; the position of Alexander in the Divine Comedy, though, is more uncertain, for though there is a reference to an Alexander being punished in the Circle of the Violent (Canto XII), it is not explicit as to whether this is in fact Alexander the Great himself. Alexander, however, is notably absent from Dante's depiction of virtuous pagans (Canto IV).
 Alexandre le Grand, tragedy in five acts by Jean Racine, first staged 1665.
 In 1868 Tchaikovsky contemplated writing an opera featuring Alexander the Great, taking place in Greece and Babylon and centering on the relations between Hebrews and Greeks. The plot would have featured a Jewish woman falling in love with Alexander and for his sake leaving her Jewish lover, who eventually becomes a prophet. However, though surviving Tchaikovsky letters include details of this planned opera, its plot and characters, he finally abandoned this plan and chose instead for an opera with a Russian background.
 Rudyard Kipling's story "The Man Who Would Be King" (1888) provides some glimpses of Alexander's legacy.  Made into a movie of the same title in 1975, starring Sean Connery and Michael Caine.
 Dutch writer Louis Couperus' Iskander. De roman van Alexander den Groote (1920) is a historical novel about Alexander after his invasion of Asia. Largely based on the Alexander historians Quintus Curtius Rufus, Arrian, and Plutarch, the novel thematises Alexander's psychological condition during the last years of his life.
 Lord Dunsany's play Alexander (1925) is a dramatization of Alexander's life, with fantastic elements. In this work Alexander encounters the god Apollo and the Queen of the Amazons. 
 Alexander appears in "A Trooper of the Thessalians" (1926), a short story by Arthur D. Howden Smith.
 In 1949, Terence Rattigan's play Adventure Story, based on Alexander the Great, premiered in London.
 Robert Payne published a novel in 1954 about Alexander's life, Alexander the God (not to be confused with the Druon novel, below).
 In 1958, Maurice Druon wrote a novel about Alexander, Alexandre le Grand (1958). It was translated into English as Alexander the God (1960) by Humphrey Hare.
 From 1969 to 1981, Mary Renault wrote a historical fiction trilogy on the life of Alexander: Fire from Heaven (about his early life), The Persian Boy (about his conquest of Persia, his expedition to India, and his death, seen from the viewpoint of Bagoas, a Persian eunuch and Alexander's eromenos), and Funeral Games (about the events following his death). Alexander also appears briefly in Renault's novel The Mask of Apollo, and is alluded to directly in The Last of the Wine and indirectly in The Praise Singer. In addition to the fiction, Renault also wrote a non-fiction biography, The Nature of Alexander.
 Science fiction writer Poul Anderson wrote an alternate history story, "Eutopia" (1967), featuring a timeline where Alexander the Great lived to an old age and established a stable empire that endured to modern times as an enlightened, peaceful and advanced Greek-speaking world culture. Similar "Alexandrian timelines" also appear in several other alternate histories by various writers.
 Ivan Efremov wrote a historical novel Thais of Athens about the life of hetaira Thaïs, as she follows Alexander in his campaigns. Alexander and Thaïs have a love relationship in the novel.
 French writer Roger Peyrefitte wrote a trilogy about Alexander the great which is regarded as a masterpiece of erudition: La Jeunesse d'Alexandre, Les Conquêtes d'Alexandre and Alexandre le Grand.
 In Alan Moore's Watchmen, one of the main characters, Ozymandias, goes into detail about how he followed in Alexander the Great's footsteps in order to achieve enlightenment.
 A trilogy of novels about Alexander was written in Italian by Valerio Massimo Manfredi and subsequently published in an English translation, entitled Child of a Dream, The Sands of Ammon and The Ends of the Earth.
 David Gemmell's Dark Prince features Alexander as the chosen vessel for a world-destroying demon king. .
 Judith Tarr's historical fantasy novel Lord of the Two Lands (1993) is about the relationship between Alexander and an Egyptian priestess.
 Steven Pressfield's 2004 book The Virtues of War is told from the first-person perspective of Alexander. Pressfield's novel The Afghan Campaign is told from the point of view of a soldier in Alexander's army. Alexander makes several brief appearances in the novel.
 In Fate/Zero, the light novel authored by Gen Urobuchi,  Alexander (going by the name Iskandar) appears as the Servant Rider, and is referred to as the King of Conquerors.
 In Stephen Baxter's A Time Odyssey series, Alexander plays a part in the first and third books, featuring an encounter with Genghis Khan's horde and the extension of Alexander's empire into the New World.
 In Nicholas Nicastro's 2004 historical novel Empire of Ashes, Alexander's career is described from the perspective of a skeptical Athenian soldier/historian who must debunk Alexander's official divinity to save himself from a charge of sacrilege.
 Eternity by Greg Bear features an alternate reality in which Alexander did not die young and his empire flourished instead of collapsing.
 In the novel by Jonathan Swift, Gulliver's Travels in part III, chapter VII, Gulliver sees and talks to the ghost of Alexander.
 In the pages of The Haunted Tank from DC Comics, the spirit of Alexander sent the spirit of Confederate General J.E.B. Stuart to protect World War II Lieutenant Jeb Stuart Smith and the light tank M3 Stuart he commands.
 In Tom Holt's comic novel Alexander at the World's End an impoverished scholar's life is set upon a new course when he becomes Alexander's tutor.

 Hitoshi Iwaaki's Historie tells what Alexander is in his opinion. Alexander in the story is timid, but smart. He has a split-personality disorder, the original one has a snake birthmark on his face, another one named Hephaestion puts makeup to conceal it, as he loathes snakes, which his mother Olympias worships. His birth also was questioned, but easily extinguished when his mother killed the man rumored to be his real father.

Television
Alexander the Great (1968), TV series pilot, starring William Shatner as Alexander, directed by Phil Karlson.
The Search for Alexander the Great  (1981) is a 4-part miniseries that chronicles Alexander's life that was distributed by PBS.
Alexander Senki (1997), known as Reign: The Conqueror or Alexander in other territories, is an anime TV series, starring Toshihiko Seki as Alexander, directed by Yoshinori Kanemori, and with character designs by Peter Chung. The series is based on the novel Alexander Senki by Hiroshi Aramata, and fictionalizes the life of Alexander.
The middle episodes of Chanakya, a 1991 Indian TV series based on Chanakya, depicts Alexander's invasion of northwestern India, his death, and the rebellion led by native Indian kingdoms under the leadership of Maurya Empire founder Chandragupta Maurya against Alexander's successors in India.
The 1996 miniseries Gulliver's Travels, starring Ted Danson, featured a visit from Alexander the Great.
In the Smallville season 1 episode "Rogue", Lex Luthor shows Clark Kent the armor that Alexander the Great wore in battle. The breastplate is gold, with red and blue diamonds (the colors that represent Superman), and a snake shaped like the letter S.
 In the Footsteps of Alexander the Great (1998), mini-series, hosted by Michael Wood, directed by David Wallace.
In the miniseries Yu-Gi-Oh! Capsule Monsters, Alexander the Great was the main villain in the Capsule Monster World.
Alexander was occasionally featured on Histeria!, depicted as a somewhat egotistical man who liked to make it clear that "I'm great! Ha ha!" The first episode to feature him was "Really Really Oldies But Goodies", which featured a sketch about his habit of naming cities after himself, which leads to a scene where World's Oldest Woman gives Toast multiple directions to different cities called Alexandria. In "A Blast in the Past", Alexander consults Sigmund Freud about his past, fretting about the fact that his father always considered him "pretty good" rather than "great". Finally, in "When Time Collides!", Alexander is shown as the reigning champion on a Jeopardy! parody, because all of the correct responses to the answers are centered on him. He even finds a way to win when Charity Bazaar gives the correct response.
The second season of Spike TV's Deadliest Warrior, which features computer simulated battles between historical warriors, pitted Alexander the Great (portrayed by Jason Faunt) against Attila the Hun, with Attila emerging victorious, with 59.6% of the wins.
Chandragupta Maurya, a 2011-2012 Indian TV series based on Maurya Empire founder Chandragupta Maurya, depicts Alexander's invasion of northwestern India, his encounter with a young Chandragupta, and Chandragupta's subsequent rivalry with Alexander's successor Seleucus I Nicator.
Porus, a 2017 Indian TV series based on the life of Porus, depicts his battle with Alexander, played by Rohit Purohit.
In the Marvel Studios miniseries Moon Knight, Alexander's tomb is discovered, and it is revealed that Alexander was the last avatar of goddess Ammit.

Radio
Alexander a six-part BBC Radio 4 series by David Wade starred Michael Maloney as Alexander.

Film

Baz Luhrmann had been planning to make a film about Alexander, starring Leonardo DiCaprio, but the release of Stone's film eventually persuaded him to abandon the project.

Music

Video games
Alexander is a character in the computer games Age of Empires and Rise of Nations: Thrones and Patriots.
Alexander is a leader of the Greeks in five of six games of the Sid Meier's Civilization series, and the leader of Macedon in Civilization VI. He is a lone Greek leader in the original, third and fifth games, a male leader in the second game (the Amazonian queen Hippolyta being the Greek female leader), and the lone leader of the Greek civilization in the fourth game (until Pericles joins him in an expansion pack) and has the leader traits Aggressive and Philosophical.
In the second Rome: Total War expansion pack, Alexander, Alexander the Great's conquests are chronicled in a campaign and the six battles in the 'Historical Battles' campaign are modeled on Alexander's battles.
Almost all the battles fought by Alexander appear and are playable in the game Ancient Battle: Alexander, the player can also choose to play against Alexander.
Alexander the Great is also featured in the game called Rise and Fall: Civilizations at War released by Midway games.
He is also mentioned in the computer game Age Of Mythology, in the history information text of the unit called Hetairoi.
Alexander is also mentioned in Age of Empires II during the Saladin campaign and in the Conquerors expansion pack in the Attila the Hun campaign.
In Stainless Steel Studios' 2001 game Empire Earth, several of the levels in the Greek campaign revolve around Alexander's conquests. He is also depicted on the game's cover.
In the Chicago level of Tony Hawk's Pro Skater 4, a barber shop is called Alexander the Great Barber shop.
In the 'Fate' series, Alexander the Great is called the Iskander, King of Conquerors. His spirit is resurrected and becomes a Rider-Class servant used to fight for the prize of the Holy Grail. Iskandar is briefly mentioned in the first visual novel game and anime series Fate/stay night as an example of the Rider-class Servant. It was hinted that he was the most powerful of the characters, but died in a two-versus-one battle. He is detailed in full as Rider in the prequel, Fate/Zero. He is summonable in the game Fate/Grand Order as both Iskander and Alexander (the latter of which represents Alexander as a boy, also a Rider-class Servant).
In Assassin's Creed II, it is said that a deceased Assassin, Iltani, poisoned Alexander the Great.
In BioShock 2, a now hideously mutated and clinically insane researcher, Gil Alexander, who was a part of Big Daddy production refers to himself as Alex the Great.
In the video game Dante's Inferno, "the great Alexander" is mentioned as being one that had previously tried to battle his way through Hell.
In the fashion of Mike Tyson, many of the enemies in the game God Hand will taunt the main character, Gene, by saying "I'm Alexander the Great!" and "You're not Alexander!"
 Several games in the Final Fantasy series feature a being called Alexander that can be summoned in battle and appears as a moving fortress with holy-elemental attacks. While most of these appearances do not seem to be related to the historical Alexander, the MMORPG Final Fantasy XIV: A Realm Reborn, in which he appears as an entire raid dungeon of his own, has made more direct references to Alexander the Great by naming two partitions of the dungeon after Gordias and Midas. An area within Alexander where the player attempts to disable his engine is referred to as the Gordian Knot.
Alexander is a playable character in the Mobile/PC Game Rise of Kingdoms

Airports
At least two airports have been named after Alexander:
 Kavala International Airport "Alexander the Great", in Eastern Macedonia and Thrace (Greece);
 Skopje "Alexander the Great" Airport, in the Republic of North Macedonia.

Other
Shaun Alexander, of the Seattle Seahawks, is often referred to as "Alexander the Great".
Alexander Ovechkin, of the Washington Capitals, is often referred to as "Alexander the Great".
He was depicted on the reverse of the Greek 100 drachmas coin of 1990-2001.
The 9K720 Iskander, a Russian mobile theater ballistic missile system.
Secunderabad, a city in India is named after Sikandar Jah, in turn named based on a derivative of Alexander's name.
 The biography of Lord Macharius, a famous conqueror from the Warhammer 40000 universe, copies that of Alexander's conquests in general details.
Tarbox Strategic Growth Equities, Co., adopted a modified historical image of Alexander as its corporate logo in 2015.
"Alexander the Great vs. Ivan the Terrible", a 2016 episode of Epic Rap Battles of History, featured Zach Sherwin portraying Alexander in a rap battle against Ivan the Terrible (portrayed by Peter Shukoff) and others.

References

 
Dynamic lists